Jimmy Hollywood is a 1994 American comedy film written and directed by Barry Levinson and starring Joe Pesci and Christian Slater. It was released on April 1, 1994, and was a box office bomb, grossing just $3 million against its $30 million budget. While initially unsuccessful at the box office, it has since gained a cult following.

Plot 
Jimmy Alto is a failing actor living in Los Angeles. After increasing frustration with his career going nowhere and with crime in the city, Jimmy, along with his "spaced-out" best friend William, decides to take the law into his own hands.

After losing his job as a waiter, Jimmy transforms himself into "Jericho," leader of a mock-vigilante group that videotapes criminals and then turns them over to the police. Jimmy enjoys the free publicity, anonymously, but eventually the police begin to close in on him, resulting in a tense standoff at the Grauman's Egyptian Theatre.

Cast
 Joe Pesci as Jimmy Alto / Jericho
 Christian Slater as William
 Victoria Abril as Lorraine De La Peña
 Robert LaSardo as ATM Robber
 Earl Billings as Police Captain
 Jason Beghe as Detective
 Rob Weiss as himself / Director of "Urban Nomad"
 Chad McQueen as himself / Audition Partner
 Barry Levinson as himself / Director of "Life Story"
 Harrison Ford as himself (uncredited)

Production
Robbie Robertson created music for the film and produced the soundtrack, with Howard Drossin providing additional music.

Reception
Rotten Tomatoes give the film a 22% approval rating from a sample of 23 reviews, with an average rating of 4/10. Roger Ebert gave the film 2 stars out of 4. Ebert praises the actors "who find the right tone for the material", but criticize the plot, which "weighs them down". He concludes "Here are characters who might have really amounted to something, and we can see the movie dying right under their feet."

Audiences polled by CinemaScore gave the film an average grade of "C" on an A+ to F scale.

Produced on a budget of $30 million, the film made less than $4 million in ticket sales.

Year-end lists 
Dishonorable mention – Glenn Lovell, San Jose Mercury News

References

External links 
 
 
 

1994 films
1994 comedy films
American comedy films
American vigilante films
Films about actors
Films directed by Barry Levinson
Films scored by Robbie Robertson
Films set in Los Angeles
Paramount Pictures films
1990s vigilante films
1990s English-language films
1990s American films